Peter John Nott (30 December 1933 – 20 August 2018) was an English Anglican bishop: from 1985 to 1999, he served as Bishop of Norwich.

Nott was educated at Bristol Grammar School, Dulwich College and Fitzwilliam College, Cambridge. He began his ordained ministry as a curate at Harpenden after which he was chaplain at Fitzwilliam College and then Rector of Beaconsfield. In 1977 he was appointed the suffragan Bishop of Taunton; he was ordained a bishop on 18 October 1977, by Donald Coggan, Archbishop of Canterbury, at St Paul's Cathedral. He was translated to be the Bishop of Norwich upon the confirmation of his election on 12 November 1985. He retired in 1999 but continued to serve as an honorary assistant bishop in the Diocese of Oxford.

References

1933 births
2018 deaths
Alumni of Fitzwilliam College, Cambridge
People educated at Bristol Grammar School
People educated at Dulwich College
Fellows of Fitzwilliam College, Cambridge
Bishops of Taunton
Bishops of Norwich
20th-century Church of England bishops